You Fly is a 2009 Egyptian film directed by Ahmed El Guindi. The three genres in this film include: comedy, romance, and fantasy. The film stars Ahmed Mekky as the main character (Baheeg), Donia Samir Ghanem (Laila) as his love interest, with Youssef Atef, Maged El Kedwany, Ahmed El Meligy, Hisham Ismail, and more. The film is a production of Hama Film Productions, and was distributed by Arabic Cinema Production and Distribution. The cinematography was done by Ahmed Gabr, and the editing was done by Salafa Noureddine. The film portrays a nerdy veterinarian who falls in love with a girl who is blind to his existence, and seeks help from a genie to get her attention.

Plot summary
A didactic man who works as a veterinary named Baheeg (Ahmed Mekky) is in love with a girl named Laila (Donia Samir Ghanem), who brings her dog into his clinic from time to time. Baheeg is a very goofy guy and is unable to grasp her attention. All is going poorly until Mared, a genie who is trying to pass his "genie exams", comes along and grants Baheeg wishes to attempt to captivate the girl of his dreams. Mared transforms Baheeg into different people with different personalities and forms in order to make Leila fall in love with him. All his attempts seem to fail, but he ends up helping Mared nonetheless to graduate genie school by signing an approval document. Laila’s dog bends up becoming sick and Laila takes it to Baheeg, who is, at this point, his true self. They end up getting married. Throughout a comedic, yet anticipating story, we see how all fails when one attempts to be someone that they are not, and that receiving help from a friend can benefit one even if that was not the initial intention.

Cast 

Ahmed Mekky as Baheeg
Donia Samir Ghanem as Laila
Youssef Atef as young Baheeg
Maged El Kedwany as Mared
Ahmed El Meligy as Baheeg’s grandfather
Hisham Ismail as Sherif
Lotfy Labib as Am Noshy
Mohamed Sallam as Joe
Adel Shaaban as Baheeg’s father
Mervat Tabana as Baheeg’s mother
Enjy Wegdan as Dalia, guest of honor

Production
Supervising producer: Emad Mourad
Executive producer: Mostafa Sakr
Executive producer: Hisham Soliman
Executive producer: Karim Youssef
Cinematography: Ahmed Gabr
Music: Amr Ismail
Art direction: Hamdy Abdel-rahman
Costume design: Marwa Abdel Samie

Critical reception
Teer Enta has a total of 7.2/10 stars out of 1,531 reviews on IMDb. There have yet been any critical reviews on the film, due to its unfortunate lack in popularity. Although, a majority of viewers believe it to be a hit in the movie industry.

External links
 
 http://www.masress.com/en/almasryalyoumen/38486

See also
Bedazzled (2000 film)

2009 films
Egyptian fantasy films
Egyptian romantic comedy films